As of December 2018, Indian airline TruJet flies to a total of 20 destinations. All destinations are domestic.

List

 References

Lists of airline destinations